Stockeld Park is a Grade-I listed country house and estate situated between the towns of Wetherby and Harrogate, North Yorkshire, England, which is now the home of Peter (a great-grandchild of Robert John Foster) and Susie Grant. The estate spans some 2,000 acres and broadly covers the area between Wetherby and the villages of Spofforth and Sicklinghall.  

In addition to traditional activities including farming and properties, Stockeld Park is also home to Yorkshire's largest Christmas tree plantation, with some 500,000 Christmas trees in the ground.  It is perhaps best known for its Adventure Park, a seasonal attraction with a range of indoor and outdoor activities that vary by season. In winter for example there is: ice skating, cross-country skiing, an Enchanted Forest, Santa's Grotto and a giant, snowflake-shaped yew tree maze. Other seasons offer adventure playgrounds, boating, pedal go-karts, motorised scooters and a range of themed events. 

The mansion house itself is constructed of stone in the style of a Palladian villa and features a cantilevered staircase, 18th and 19th century furniture and works of art. Features of the grounds include a dovecote, lodges, a ha-ha, a walled garden and thatched timber loggia.

History
The  Stockeld (also earlier known as Stokeld) estate has its name from the half knight's fee of land held by Nigel de Stokeld (also Stockeld) in 1166, formerly part of the estates of William de Percy.  Around 1315, the Stockeld estate passed to William de Middleton of Ilkley. In 1757, William de Middleton commissioned architect James Paine to build the present house, which was completed by 1763. William Middelton died before it was completed and the house and estate passed to his infant great-nephew, William Constable. Constable adopted the name and arms of Middelton and eventually took up residence, but his wife, the mother of his 10 children, had a high-profile affair with a groom. William, after divorcing his wife, left Stockeld to live in his other property in Ilkley, leaving the house empty for some two decades. Succeeding generations of Middeltons continued to live at Ilkley, leasing out Stockeld until it was eventually sold in 1893 to Robert John Foster, owner of Black Dyke Mills in Bradford. 

Foster commissioned architect Detmar Blow to make several improvements, including converting the orangery to a chapel, and was appointed High Sheriff of Yorkshire for 1898–99. During the Second World War, the house was requisitioned for use as a maternity hospital. The chapel dates from 1895 and is a grade II listed building.

Stockeld is also known to many people as Oakwell Hall from the ITV soap Emmerdale. In 2006 the Grants opened a Christmas Tree shop in Stockeld Park where they sell trees grown on the estate to the community.

See also
The Christmas Adventure

References

External links

 Official Facebook page
The Mansion House at Stockeld Park
Stockeld Park
The Lords of Ilkley Manor – The Road to Ruin. The Middelton Family of Stockeld Park (1763–1947) By David Carpenter
 Evelyn Wallace -The Castle Lady 

Country houses in North Yorkshire
Grade I listed buildings in North Yorkshire
Grade I listed houses